Polyptychus potiendus is a moth of the  family Sphingidae. It is known from Cameroon.

References

Polyptychus
Moths described in 1990